Anthony Vasquez may refer to:

 Anthony Vasquez (baseball) (born 1986), baseball pitcher
 Anthony Vázquez (footballer) (born 1988), American-born Puerto Rican footballer